LAMOST J112456.61+453531.3 (unofficial abbreviation J1124+4535) is a magnitude 13.98 star in the constellation Ursa Major, below the "bowl" of the Big Dipper. It is located approximately 60,000 light-years from Earth.

Initial observations of J1124+4535 by the Large Sky Area Multi-Object Fibre Spectroscopic Telescope showed low amounts of magnesium, and later, the Subaru Telescope confirmed the low amounts of magnesium and also found high amounts of europium. J1124+4535 also lacks the same observable chemical signature as other stars in its parent interstellar cloud, indicating that J1124+4535 did not form in the cloud, confirming that the star must have formed outside the Milky Way.

The star's origin was most likely the result of a dwarf galaxy collision with the Milky Way some 5 to 9 billion years ago. The remnants of the destroyed galaxy can still be seen as the most visible streams of the galactic halo.

References

Extragalactic stars
Ursa Major (constellation)